Brett Edward Marshall (born March 22, 1990) is an American former professional baseball pitcher. He has played in Major League Baseball (MLB) for the New York Yankees.

Career
Marshall attended Sterling High School in Baytown, Texas, where he played for the school's baseball team. In 2008, Marshall was named to the All-State first team.

New York Yankees
Marshall was drafted by the New York Yankees in the sixth round of the 2008 Major League Baseball Draft. He signed with the Yankees, receiving a $850,000 signing bonus.

Marshall made his Major League debut on May 15, 2013 against the Seattle Mariners. During his debut, he threw 108 pitches in relief giving up 5 runs (all earned) including 2 home runs in  innings during a 12–2 blowout loss to the Mariners.

Marshall was optioned back to Triple-A Scranton/Wilkes-Barre on May 16. He was brought back up to the Yankees on September 1, 2013 when rosters expanded. The Yankees designated Marshall for assignment when they signed Carlos Beltrán during the 2013–14 offseason.

Cincinnati Reds
Marshall was claimed off waivers by the Chicago Cubs on December 23, 2013. He was later removed from the Cubs roster and claimed by the Cincinnati Reds on February 12, 2014. He was designated for assignment on July 10, 2014.

Colorado Rockies
Marshall signed a minor league deal with the Colorado Rockies on November 22, 2014. He was released on July 12, 2015.

Sugar Land Skeeters
Marshall signed with the Sugar Land Skeeters of the Atlantic League of Professional Baseball for the 2015 season. He became a free agent after the 2015 season.

Tampa Bay Rays
He signed a minor league deal with the Tampa Bay Rays for the 2016 season. He was released on June 2, 2016.

Second stint with Sugar Land Skeeters
On June 23, 2016, Marshall signed with the Sugar Land Skeeters of the Atlantic League of Professional Baseball. He re-signed with the club in early 2018. He was released on June 14, 2018.

Southern Maryland Blue Crabs
On June 20, 2018, Marshall signed with the Southern Maryland Blue Crabs of the Atlantic League of Professional Baseball.

Long Island Ducks
On August 31, 2018, Marshall was traded to the Long Island Ducks of the Atlantic League of Professional Baseball. He was released on May 27, 2019.

References

External links

1990 births
Living people
New York Yankees players
Gulf Coast Yankees players
Charleston RiverDogs players
Tampa Yankees players
Trenton Thunder players
Scranton/Wilkes-Barre RailRiders players
Long Island Ducks players
Louisville Bats players
Sportspeople from Harris County, Texas
Baseball players from Texas
Major League Baseball pitchers
New Britain Rock Cats players
Evansville Otters players
Sugar Land Skeeters players
Montgomery Biscuits players
Southern Maryland Blue Crabs players